Dato' Ali bin Haji Ahmad (29 June 1930 – 4 December 1977) was a Malaysian politician.

Political career
Ali was first elected to Parliament when he won the Pontian Selatan seat in the 1964 Malaysian general election under the Alliance ticket, a seat he successfully defended in the 1969 Malaysian general election unopposed.

Ali was the UMNO Division chief of Pontian after Pontian Selatan and Pontian Utara Parliament were merged before 1974 Malaysian general election. In the election, he won the newly created seat, Pontian by a walkover.

Ali was first appointed as Parliamentary Secretary to then finance minister, Tan Siew Sin on 1965, in the third Tunku Abdul Rahman cabinet. He continued as assistant to Tan Siew Sin to in the final cabinet of Tunku Abdul Rahman in 1969, and promoted to Deputy Finance Minister in the first cabinet of Tun Abdul Razak. His portfolio was switched to Deputy Minister of Home Affairs in the January 1973 cabinet reshuffle, after the admittance of Parti Islam Se-Malaysia in the Alliance-led government. In another Cabinet reshuffle on August the same year after the death of Deputy Prime Minister and Minister of Home Affairs Ismail Abdul Rahman, he was appointed as Minister of Culture, Youth and Sports, a post he retains in the 1974 Razak cabinet after the 1974 election. He holds this position until 1976, when his portfolio was changed to Minister of Agriculture and Rural Development under the new prime minister Hussein Onn's cabinet, his final position in the government.

Personal life
He was married with Datin Halimah Abdul Rahim, with 5 daughters.

Death & legacy
On 4 December 1977, while he was still Minister of Agriculture and Rural Development, he was one of the passengers killed in Malaysian Airline System Flight 653 plane crash at Tanjung Kupang, along with his press secretary Hood Fadzil. Ali was 47 years old. He was returning to Kuala Lumpur after a visit to Perlis.

Parliament's Dewan Rakyat on the next day observed a minute silence before the start of meeting as a sign of respect of Ali and others who perished in the tragedy.

The remains of Ali was buried, along with remains of other victims of the crash, in a common burial site at Jalan Kebun Teh, Johor Bahru.

Sekolah Menengah Kebangsaan Dato` Ali Hj Ahmad, a secondary school in Pontian, Johor, is named after him.

Election results

Honours
  :
  Recipient of the Malaysian Commemorative Medal (Silver) (PPM) (1965)
  :
  Companion of the Order of the Crown of Johor (SMJ) (1972)
  Knight Grand Commander of the Order of the Crown of Johor (SPMJ) – Dato' (1973)

References

1930 births
1977 deaths
Malaysian politicians
People from Johor
Malaysian people of Malay descent
Malaysian Muslims
United Malays National Organisation politicians
Members of the Dewan Rakyat
Knights Grand Commander of the Order of the Crown of Johor
Victims of aviation accidents or incidents in Malaysia
Victims of aviation accidents or incidents in 1977
Assassinated Malaysian politicians
Malaysian murder victims